Africa '70 may refer to:
 Africa '70 (band), a band associated with afrobeat musician Fela Kuti
 Africa '70 (NGO), an Italian organization